Aberdeen North is a burgh constituency of the House of Commons of the Parliament of the United Kingdom and it elects one Member of Parliament (MP) by the first past the post system of election. It was first used in the 1885 general election, but has undergone various boundary changes since that date.

As of the 2019 general election this can be considered the safest SNP seat, as it has the largest SNP vote share and relative majority.

There was also an Aberdeen North Holyrood constituency, a constituency of the Scottish Parliament, created in 1999 with the boundaries of the Westminster constituency of at that time. It was abolished in 2011 by the new constituencies of Aberdeen Donside and Aberdeen Central.

Constituency profile
The seat covers the northern half of Aberdeen including the city centre and the North Sea oil companies at the harbour.

Boundaries

Current 
As redefined by the Fifth Review of the Boundary Commission for Scotland, and subsequently first used in the 2005 general election, Aberdeen North is entirely within the Aberdeen City council area and one of five constituencies covering that council area and the Aberdeenshire council area. To the south of Aberdeen North there is Aberdeen South, which is also entirely within the Aberdeen City area. To the west there is West Aberdeenshire and Kincardine, which is entirely within the Aberdeenshire area, and to the north there is Gordon, which covers part of the Aberdeen City area and part of the Aberdeenshire area. Further north there is Banff and Buchan which, like West Aberdeenshire and Kincardine, is entirely within the Aberdeenshire area.

Fifth Review changes include the transfer of Bridge of Don, Dyce and Danestone areas from Aberdeen North to Gordon, and the new Aberdeen North has boundaries which are very different from those of the earlier constituency. The northern boundary of the earlier constituency coincided with the northern boundary of the Aberdeen City area. At that time, Aberdeen Central and Aberdeen South covered the rest of the Aberdeen City area, and all three Aberdeen constituencies were entirely within the council area.

Historic

1885 to 1918 
From 1832 to 1885 there was a single Aberdeen constituency. Prior to 1832, the burgh of Aberdeen had been represented as a component of the Aberdeen Burghs constituency.

When Aberdeen North was created by the Redistribution of Seats Act 1885 and first used in the 1885 general election, so was Aberdeen South. Aberdeen North then consisted of the municipal wards of St Clement, St Andrew, St Machar and Greyfriars, and the 10th and 11th Parliamentary Polling Districts. The rest of the county of Aberdeen was covered by the county constituencies of Eastern Aberdeenshire and Western Aberdeenshire.

The same boundaries were used in the 1886 general election, the 1892 general election, the 1895 general election, the 1900 general election, the 1906 general election, the January 1910 general election and the December 1910 general election.

1918 to 1950 
In 1918 constituency boundaries were redefined by the Representation of the People Act 1918. By then the City of Aberdeen had been created and, together with Aberdeen North, Aberdeen South became one of two constituencies covering the city (which was one of four counties of cities in Scotland) and entirely within the city. The new boundaries were first used in the 1918 general election, and Aberdeen North then consisted of the wards of Greyfriars, St Andrew, St Clement, St Machar, Torry and Woodside. The county of Aberdeen was covered by Aberdeen and Kincardine East, Central Aberdeenshire and Kincardine and West Aberdeenshire. Aberdeen and Kincardine East and Central Aberdeenshire were entirely within the county of Aberdeen. Kincardine and West Aberdeenshire covered the county of Kincardine minus the burgh of Inverbervie, which was covered by Montrose Burghs, and part of the county of Aberdeen.

The same boundaries were used in the 1922 general election, the 1923 general election, the 1924 general election, the 1929 general election, the 1931 general election, the 1935 general election and the 1945 general election.

1950 to 1955 
For the 1950 general election boundaries were redefined again, by the House of Commons (Redistribution of Seats) Act 1949. A new list of wards defined Aberdeen North - Glimonston, Greyfriars, St Clement, St Machar, St Nicholas and Woodside - but the City of Aberdeen remained a two-constituency city, divided between Aberdeen South and Aberdeen North, with both constituencies entirely within the city.

The county of Aberdeen was now again divided between East Aberdeenshire and West Aberdeenshire, with both of these constituencies entirely within the county.

The same boundaries were used for the 1951 general election.

1955 to 1983 
By the time of the 1955 general election, a boundary review had taken account of a small enlargement of the city area, and Aberdeen North was defined as consisting of the wards of Cairncry, St Andrews, St Clement's, St Machar, St Nicholas and Woodside. The same boundaries were used for the 1959 general election, the 1964 general election, the 1966 general election and the 1970 general election.

For the February 1974 general election there was, again, no change to the boundaries of Aberdeen North, but a review had defined the constituency in terms of a new list of wards. The new wards were Mastrick, Northfield, St Clement's, St Machar, St Nicholas, and Woodside. February 1974 boundaries were used also for the October 1974 general election.

In 1975, throughout Scotland, under the Local Government (Scotland) Act 1973, counties were abolished, and the City of Aberdeen was enlarged to include areas formerly within the county of Aberdeen and the county of Kincardine. Also, the city became a district within the Grampian region. The enlarged city included areas covered by the constituencies of West Aberdeenshire and North Angus and Mearns. North Angus and Mearns had been created in 1950 to cover the county of Kincardine and part of the county of Angus.

The 1979 general election was held before a review of constituency boundaries took account of new local government boundaries.

1983 to 1997 

In this period the constituency was made up of the City of Aberdeen District electoral divisions of Ashgrove, Brimmond, Kittybrewster, Mastrick, Northfield East, Northfield West, St Machar, Seaton, Summerfield, and Woodside.

The 1983 general election, the 1987 general election and the 1992 general election took place during this period.

In 1996, under the Local Government etc (Scotland) Act 1994, local government regions and districts were abolished and the city became one of 32 unitary council areas of Scotland. Also, the name of the city became, officially, Aberdeen City.

1997 to 2005 
In this period the constituency was made up of the City of Aberdeen District electoral divisions of Balgownie, Brimmond, Danestone, Mastrick, Middleton, Northfield, Summerfield, and West Don, as provided for by the Parliamentary Constituencies (Scotland) Order 1995.

Since 2005 the constituency is made up of the Aberdeen City Council wards of Auchmill, Berryden, Castlehill, Cummings Park, Donmouth, Hilton, Kittybrewster, Mastrick, Midstocket, Newhills, Pittodrie, St Machar, Seaton, Sheddocksley, Springhill, Stockethill, Summerhill, Sunnybank, and Woodside, as provided for by the Parliamentary Constituencies (Scotland) Order 2005.

As redefined for the 1997 general election Aberdeen North was one of three constituencies covering and entirely within the Aberdeen City area, the other two being Aberdeen South and Aberdeen Central. Aberdeen South shared boundaries with both of the other two constituencies.

Members of Parliament

Election results

Elections in the 1880s

Elections in the 1890s

Elections in the 1900s

Elections in the 1910s

Elections in the 1910s 

Pirie was endorsed by the Coalition Government but refused to give it his support.

Elections in the 1920s

Elections in the 1930s

Elections in the 1940s

Elections in the 1950s

Elections in the 1960s

Elections in the 1970s

Elections in the 1980s

Elections in the 1990s 

1997 result based on new boundaries

Elections in the 2000s

Elections in the 2010s

References 
Specific

General

Westminster Parliamentary constituencies in Scotland
Constituencies of the Parliament of the United Kingdom established in 1885
Politics of the county of Aberdeen
1885 establishments in Scotland